St. Paul's Episcopal Church is a church in Benicia, California.

Founded in 1855, it is the third-oldest church in the Episcopal Church of the United States of America's Diocese of Northern California.

External links
 Web site

References

Benicia, California